Mirna Camacho Pedrero (born 3 September 1959) is a Mexican politician and lawyer affiliated with the PAN. She served as Deputy of the LXI Legislature of the Mexican Congress representing Chiapas.

References

1959 births
Living people
People from Tuxtla Gutiérrez
20th-century Mexican lawyers
Women members of the Chamber of Deputies (Mexico)
National Action Party (Mexico) politicians
Mexican women lawyers
21st-century Mexican politicians
21st-century Mexican women politicians
Deputies of the LXI Legislature of Mexico
Members of the Chamber of Deputies (Mexico) for Chiapas
21st-century Mexican lawyers